St. John the Baptist Cathedral, also known as the Chalatenango Cathedral, is a Roman Catholic cathedral located in Chalatenango, El Salvador.

History 

The cathedral was proceeded by a small temple, built in 1713, located on the same site as the present cathedral. Construction of the current cathedral began in 1848 and it was completed in 1893.

Church service schedule 

The following is the schedule of services held at the cathedral:

Monday: 7:00 a.m., 5:30 p.m.
Tuesday: 7:00 a.m., 5:30 p.m.
Wednesday: 7:00 a.m., 5:30 p.m.
Thursday: 7:00 a.m., 9:00 a.m., 7:00 p.m.
Friday: 7:00 a.m., 6:00 p.m.
Saturday: 7:00 a.m., 5:30 p.m.
Sunday: 8:00 a.m., 10:00 a.m., 5:00 p.m.

References

External links 

Catedral San Juan Bautista (in English), by GCatholic

Roman Catholic cathedrals in El Salvador
Basilica churches in Central America
Roman Catholic churches completed in 1893
1840s establishments in El Salvador
19th-century Roman Catholic church buildings